Khadija Arib (born 10 October 1960) is a Moroccan-Dutch politician of the Labour Party, who served as Speaker of the House of Representatives of the Netherlands from 12 December 2015 to 7 April 2021. In the 2016 Speaker of the Dutch House of Representatives election on 13 January, she was elected to the position, which she had served as Acting Speaker since the resignation of Anouchka van Miltenburg on 12 December 2015. Arib became a member of the House of Representatives following the 1998 Dutch general election and served until 2022, with a brief interruption between 2006 and 2007.

Early life 
Khadija Arib was born on 10 October 1960 in Hedami near Casablanca in Morocco. She came to the Netherlands when she was 15 years old. Her parents worked at a laundry service in Schiedam. Arib studied sociology at the University of Amsterdam. Before her political career, she was a civil servant, educator and social worker.

Politics 
Arib is a member of the Labour Party (PvdA) and a member of Parliament from 19 May 1998 to 29 November 2006 and since 1 March 2007. In the House, she focussed on matters of racism, discrimination, abuse, domestic violence, and youth care. She has been criticised (mainly by members of the Party for Freedom) for her dual citizenship and for her part in an advisory committee to the King of Morocco. In 2012, she made an unsuccessful attempt to become speaker and became first deputy speaker instead. She was elected speaker in an interim election on 13 January 2016, defeating three other candidates. On 29 March 2017 Arib was re-elected as speaker,;she was the only candidate for the position.

Following the 2017 Dutch general election, Arib chose Edith Schippers as informateur, whose role is to explore possible governing alliances. Following Schippers' resignation, she named Herman Tjeenk Willink and Gerrit Zalm for the position. After the 2021 Dutch general election, Arib lost her position as speaker. She became a member of the opposition and was part of the PvdA fraction. After anonymous allegations of misconduct at the end of September 2021, Arib left the parliament on 3 November 2022. She was succeeded by Julian Bushoff.

Political positions
During her career, Arib has been a champion for women's rights and the empowerment of women with a migrant background in the Netherlands; she was a founding member and president of the Moroccan Women in the Netherlands Foundation. In 1989, she was held prisoner in Morocco with her 3 children, after publicly addressing issues concerning the position of women in Moroccan society. After intervention by the Dutch Ministry of Foreign Affairs, she was allowed to return to the Netherlands.

Electoral history

Bibliography 
 1992: Marokkaanse vrouwen in Nederland (Moroccan women in the Netherlands) with Essa Reijmers
 2009: Couscous op zondag (Couscous on Sundays)
 2011: Allah heeft ons zo gemaakt (Allah made us like this)

References

External links 

 Khadija Arib (in Dutch) at the House of Representatives website
 Khadija Arib (in Dutch) at the Labour Party website

1960 births
Living people
20th-century Dutch civil servants
20th-century Dutch educators
20th-century Dutch non-fiction writers
20th-century Dutch politicians
20th-century Dutch women politicians
20th-century Dutch women writers
21st-century Dutch non-fiction writers
21st-century Dutch politicians
21st-century Dutch women politicians
21st-century Dutch women writers
Dutch social workers
Dutch sociologists
Labour Party (Netherlands) politicians
Members of the House of Representatives (Netherlands)
Moroccan emigrants to the Netherlands
People from Casablanca-Settat
Speakers of the House of Representatives (Netherlands)
University of Amsterdam alumni
Women legislative speakers
Dutch women sociologists